The following is a list of pipeline accidents in the United States in 1974. It is one of several lists of U.S. pipeline accidents. See also: list of natural gas and oil production accidents in the United States.

Incidents 

This is not a complete list of all pipeline accidents. For natural gas alone, the Pipeline and Hazardous Materials Safety Administration (PHMSA), a United States Department of Transportation agency, has collected data on more than 3,200 accidents deemed serious or significant since 1987.

A "significant incident" results in any of the following consequences:
 Fatality or injury requiring in-patient hospitalization.
 $50,000 or more in total costs, measured in 1984 dollars.
 Liquid releases of five or more barrels (42 US gal/barrel).
 Releases resulting in an unintentional fire or explosion.

PHMSA and the National Transportation Safety Board (NTSB) post-incident data and results of investigations into accidents involving pipelines that carry a variety of products, including natural gas, oil, diesel fuel, gasoline, kerosene, jet fuel, carbon dioxide, and other substances. Occasionally pipelines are re-purposed to carry different products.

The following incidents occurred during 1974:
 1974 A 22-inch natural gas transmission pipeline failed in Prairie du Rocher, Illinois on January 1. The resulting fire caused no serious damage, but 7,000 people in the area were left without gas heating for several sub-freezing days.
 1974 On January 25, a pipeline failed near Liberty, Texas, spilling about 200 barrels of oil into the Trinity River.
 1974 On March 2, a 30-inch gas pipeline failed at 797 pounds pressure inside a 34-inch casing pipe under a road near Monroe, Louisiana. 10 acres of forest were burned, but there were no injuries or deaths. A substandard girth weld was the cause. The failure of automatic valves on the pipeline to close upon a pressure drop was also cited as contributing to the size of the accident.
 1974 A gas transmission pipeline ruptured near Farmington, New Mexico on March 15, killing a family of three in a truck driving nearby when the gas ignited. Corrosion along the longitudinal seem weld of the pipe section caused the failure.
 1974 A gas line in a commercial building in New York, New York, was ruptured by falling equipment in a basement on April 22. The escaping gas later exploded, injuring more than 70 people.
 1974 A previously damaged gas main ruptured in Philadelphia, Pennsylvania on May 3, causing an explosion that killed two, and caused extensive damage to four row homes. Earlier plumbing work was thought to have caused the gas line damage.
 1974 On May 21, a 6-inch gas-gathering pipeline ruptured at the edge of a rural road south of Meridian, Mississippi. Three vehicles entered the area which contained the escaping gas, and stalled near the rupture. The gas ignited at 10:05 p.m., and five persons died as a result. Although less than four years old, the 6-inch pipe had corroded internally and had been embrittled by hydrogen.
 1974 A 30-inch Transcontinental Pipeline gas transmission pipeline failed and gas ignited near Bealeton, Virginia, on June 9, from hydrogen stress cracking. Failure alarms at the nearest upstream gas compressor station did not activate, and the pipeline failure was first noticed by a compressor station employee happening to see the large fire from the pipeline rupture.
 1974 On July 5, a 10 inch MAPCO propane pipeline, exposed by recent rains, exploded & burned, near DeWitt, Iowa. There were no injuries.
 1974 In July, a Lakehead 34-inch pipeline burst near Bemidji, Minnesota, spilling between 125,000 and 210,000 gallons of crude oil.
 1974 On August 13, an ammonia pipeline failed near Hutchinson, Kansas after a pump station was started against a closed valve. Three police officers were treated for ammonia inhalation; approximately 200 persons were evacuated from the area of the vapors; trees, lawns, shrubbery, and crops were chemically burned; and an estimated 11,000 fish were killed. It was found that this pipeline had exceeded the maximum operating pressure before failure.
 1974 September 3, a contractor working to install curbs and gutters in the community of Dale, Wisconsin pulled a gas line apart underneath the town's bank. Gas seeped into the bank's basement and exploded, destroying the bank and the neighboring post office. A bank manager preparing to open the bank for the afternoon was killed, and another resident was seriously injured.
 1974 On September 14, a propane pipeline to an underground storage cavern failed in Griffith, Indiana. The propane later caught fire. 1,000 residents were evacuated during the incident.
 1974 A 12-inch gas-gathering pipeline exploded and burned near Meta, Kentucky on November 24. There were no injuries reported. Acts of vandalism against the pipeline company had happened before.
 1974 A crew repairing a leaking crude oil pipeline near Abilene, Texas were overcome by sour crude oil fumes on December 1. Six of the repair crew died. The leak was caused by improper welding.

References

Lists of pipeline accidents in the United States
pipeline accidents
1974 in the environment
1974 in the United States